Qandar Kheyl (also Romanized as Qandār Kheyl) is a village in Gahrbaran-e Jonubi Rural District, Gahrbaran District, Miandorud County, Mazandaran Province, Iran. At the 2006 census, its population was 329, in 94 families.

References 

Populated places in Miandorud County